Glenn Weiss (born 6 September 1961) is an American producer and director of television and live events. He has won 14 Emmy Awards and eight Directors Guild of America awards as a director and producer for various awards shows and reality shows including the Tony Awards, Kennedy Center Honors, and Academy Awards.

Early life
Weiss was raised in a Jewish family. He graduated from the University of Maryland in 1983.

Career

Weiss started his career working at the Washington, D.C. bureau of CNN before becoming a producer and director at Fox affiliate WTTG. His first national credit was America's Most Wanted, followed by other shows including Studs, Legends of the Hidden Temple, Gladiators 2000, and talk shows hosted by Jane Pratt and Tempestt Bledsoe in the years since.

As of 2018, Weiss has won 14 Emmy Awards, and, as of 2015, five Directors Guild of America Awards for Outstanding Directorial Achievement, and has been nominated for Producers Guild of America Awards.

Weiss has also directed numerous televised events, including 20 Tony Awards, 7 Academy Awards, for which he has garnered three directing Primetime Emmys and has directed and produced Primetime Emmy Awards. Other directing credits include the Kennedy Center Honors, CableACE Awards, Billboard Music Awards, BET Awards, Peter Pan Live!, The SpongeBob Musical: Live On Stage!, Nickelodeon Kids' Choice Awards, Dick Clark's New Year's Rockin' Eve, Primetime Emmy Awards, Live from Lincoln Center, and the American Music Awards. He also directed the 2020 DNC.

Weiss was the director of the 94th Academy Awards. According to executive Rob Mills in a Variety article referring to the Will Smith and Chris Rock incident, “One quick shout out I want to give is to the director Glenn Weiss. I was in the truck with him in our control room on New Year’s Eve when Mariah Carey was having some vocal issues singing. I was with him when they did the wrong envelope on ‘La La Land’ and I was with him last night. And there is nobody who keeps a cooler head and just keeps the show moving along. While obviously, knowing exactly what’s happening. He really is the best in these situations.”.

Personal life
During the 70th Primetime Emmy Awards on September 18th, 2018, Weiss made headlines by proposing to long-time girlfriend Jan Svendsen during his acceptance speech for Outstanding Directing for a Variety Special for his work on that year's Academy Awards. He proposed by saying, "You wonder why I don’t like to call you my girlfriend? Because I want to call you my wife." The ring previously belonged to his mother, who had died two and a half weeks prior. The moment was widely shared on social media platforms Twitter and Instagram.

References

External links
 
 

1961 births
20th-century American Jews
American television directors
American television producers
Emmy Award winners
Living people
University of Maryland, College Park alumni
21st-century American Jews